Khaled Galal (born 12 April 1967) is a former player in the Zamalek SC and a trainer for some Egyptian League clubs and the interim coach of Zamalek for several spells, in which he won the 2017–18 Egypt Cup.

Coaching career
Khaled Galal took over the training of the FC Masr on 4 February 2020, to succeed Abdul Nasser Mohammed.

Managerial statistics

Honours

As a manager
Zamalek SC:
Egypt Cup: 2017–18

References

External links

Living people
1967 births
Egyptian footballers
Zamalek SC players
Egyptian football managers
Zamalek SC managers
Association footballers not categorized by position